Syritta leona is a species of syrphid fly in the family Syrphidae.

Distribution
Angola, Burundi, Cameroon, the Congo (the Republic of the Congo and DRC), the Gambia, Ghana, Nigeria, Sierra Leone, South Africa, Uganda, Zambia.

References

Eristalinae
Diptera of Africa
Insects described in 2005